

Notes

References

Bibliography 
Rayfield, D. (2013) Edge of Empires: A History of Georgia, Reaktion Books, 
W.E.D. Allen (1970) Russian Embassies to the Georgian Kings, 1589–1605, Hakluyt Society,  (hbk)

Bagrationi dynasty of the Kingdom of Kartli
House of Mukhrani
Georgian family trees
Kartli Bagrationi